Ervin Acél  is the name of:

 Ervin Acél (conductor) (1935–2006), Romanian conductor
 Ervin Acel (fencer) (1888–1958), Hungarian-born American Olympic fencer